Antaeus was a giant of Libya in Greek and Berber mythology.

Antaeus may also refer to:

Arts
 Antaeus (band), a French black metal band
 Antaeus (comics), two fictional characters from DC Comics
 Antaeus (magazine), a defunct American literary magazine
 "Antaeus" (short story), by Borden Deal

Other uses
Antaeus (physician), a doctor of ancient Greece
 Cocytius antaeus, a moth
 Antaeus (perfume), a fragrance for men produced by Chanel
 Antonov An-22 "Antaeus", a Soviet heavy transport aircraft
 Nemty, an Egyptian god